Flash Gordon: The Official Story of the Film is a book by John Walsh published on November 27, 2020. This is a behind the scenes look at the making of the film Flash Gordon from 1980. Walsh had previously written Harryhausen: The Lost Movies.

Overview
The book features new interviews with cast and creative, including stars Sam J. Jones and Brian Blessed and director Mike Hodges, who wrote the foreword, as well as behind-the-scenes photography.

John Walsh, film-maker and author, retrieved about 40 designs for director Nicolas Roeg's unmade version of the film from the British Film Institute archives. In an interview with Dalya Alberge of The Observer, Walsh describes the unseen materials from  who attempted the make the film in the late 1970s: "It's public knowledge that Roeg worked on the film’s development. What hasn't been seen is its artwork".

Forbidden Planet TV's Andrew Sumner interviewed Walsh about the task of tracking down the missing images for the book and why it has taken so long for the film to receive its new status as a cult classic.

In an interview with The Book of Man, Walsh explained the difficulty of getting this book agreed for publication: "My plan to write a book about the making of the film was a long process. After writing Harryhausen: The Lost Movies for Titan Books, in 2019. I planned to follow up with a book on the making of Flash Gordon. Wondering why no one had thought of making this before I was confident my publisher would say yes, and they did. What I didn't expect was what followed. For years my publisher and many others had tried and failed to secure the rights to get a book about the making of the film published. I was warned by a friend who worked in as an attorney in Hollywood that the rights for the project were a hornet's nest. For eight months, I worked with the various rights holders and along the way, uncovered another uncomfortable truth. Even if I can secure the rights to pen this making-of book, there are very few images that will help tell the story or convince readers it is worth shelling out £35.00".

Josh Weiss at Syfy Wire wrote about the task of getting an accurate picture of a film that was over 40 years old. Walsh said: "I had to go around to each and every person who took part in the film, find out what they thought was the truth, then go back to them, and actually verify. A lot of what happened in 40 years was that people had created their own mythology. I started with Post-It notes, then got a massive whiteboard in my office, and got loads of cards and had to do strings and everything. [I noted] where the evidence was confirmed, where it was contradictory, and who I could go back to, and how I could try and get people to admit they were wrong or maybe find out that they were wrong".

BBC Online’s Nicholas Barber discussed with Walsh the appeal of the film and how it was portrayed in the book: "In 1980, if you'd just seen Superman and The Empire Strikes Back, you would have been underwhelmed by the flying and the other special effects. But time has been kind to Flash Gordon. Once you stop obsessing over the technical aspects, you can see that it was meant to be quite stylised, and the energy very much comes through".

Den of Geek's Kirsten Howard asked Walsh what the most surprising revelation he discovered writing the book: "There were two big moments. The first was when I discovered there had been an entirely different film planned – and we got the artwork, it's in the book. Then, I found out that the film was supposed to have an entirely different ending".

In 2021 the book was nominated as Book for the Year for the Rondo Hatton Classic Horror Awards.

Publication
Flash Gordon: The Official Story of the Film was published in November 2020 by Titan Books.

Further reading

External links
 Official website

References

2020 non-fiction books
Books about film directors
Coffee table books
History of film
Flash Gordon
Titan Books titles